Jacklight is a 1984 poetry collection by Louise Erdrich. The collection grew from poems Erdrich wrote for her 1979 Master of Arts thesis at Johns Hopkins University.

Table of Contents
Jacklight
"Jacklight"
Runaways
"A Love Medicine"
"Family Reunion"
"Indian Boarding School: The Runaways"
"Dear John Wayne"
"Rugaroo"
"Francine's Room"
"The Lady in the Pink Mustang"
"Walking in the Breakdown Lane"
Hunters
"The Woods"
"The Levelers"
"Train"
"Captivity"
"Chahinkapa Zoo"
"The King of Owls"
"Painting of a White Gate and Sky"
"Night Sky"
The Butcher's Wife
"The Butcher's Wife"
"That Pull from the Left"
"Clouds"
"Shelter"
"The Slow Sting of Her Company"
"Here Is a Good Word for Step-and-a-Half Waleski"
"Portrait of the Town Leonard"
"Leonard Commits Redeeming Adulteries with All the Women in Town"
"Leonard Refuses to Atone"
"Unexpected Dangers"
"My Name Repeated on the Lips of the Dead"
"A Mother's Hell"
"The Book of Water"
"To Otto, in Forgetfulness"
"New Vows"
Myths
"I Was Sleeping Where the Black Oaks Move"
"The Strange People"
"The Lefavor Girls"
"Three Sisters"
"Whooping Cranes"
"Old Man Potchikoo"
"The Birth of Potchikoo"
"Potchikoo Marries"
"How Potchikoo Got Old"
"The Death of Potchikoo"
"Windigo"
"The Red Sleep of Beasts"
"Turtle Mountain Reservation"

References

1984 books
American poetry collections
Works by Louise Erdrich
Holt, Rinehart and Winston books